Olivier Meslay OAL (born December 4, 1956 in Rabat) is a Moroccan-born French art historian and curator. A scholar of British art, Meslay is the fifth director of the Clark Art Institute.

Career
He received a Bachelor of Arts in 1981 and Master of Arts in 1982 from the Paris-Sorbonne University. Meslay then earned another Master of Arts from the École du Louvre in 1983.

Meslay has worked in curatorial and directorial capacities for various museums. He started as a Researcher for Galerie Bailly in Paris from 1984 to 1991. Meslay was then named Curator of British, American, and Spanish Paintings at the Louvre from 1993 to 2006, also overseeing Louvre Atlanta. He was then appointed Chief Curator-in-Charge of Louvre-Lens until 2009. At that point, Meslay moved to the United States to become the Barbara Thomas Lemmon Curator of European Art at the Dallas Museum of Art until 2016, including a stint as Interim Director from 2011 to 2012. In that year, he was named the Felda and Dena Hardymon Director of the Clark Art Institute, the fifth director in its history and replacing Michael Conforti, who had been director since 1994.

In 2009, Meslay was named Chevalier of the Ordre des Arts et des Lettres by the Government of France.

See also
List of members of the Ordre des Arts et des Lettres

References

External links
Center for Curatorial Leadership profile

1956 births
Living people
Writers from Rabat
Moroccan emigrants to France
Moroccan emigrants to the United States
Paris-Sorbonne University alumni
École du Louvre alumni
French art historians
People associated with the Louvre
Chevaliers of the Ordre des Arts et des Lettres